This is a list of ministers of Foreign Affairs of Brazil.

Empire of Brazil

Reign of Pedro I

Regency period

Reign of Pedro II

Republican period

First Brazilian Republic

Second Brazilian Republic

Estado Novo (Third Brazilian Republic)

Fourth Brazilian Republic

Military Dictatorship (Fifth Brazilian Republic)

Sixth Brazilian Republic

See also 

 List of Ministers of Justice of Brazil
 List of Ministers of Health of Brazil

References

 
Foreign Affairs